Pulmonary hyalinizing granuloma is a lesional pattern of pulmonary inflammatory pseudotumor.

Pathology 

Pulmonary hyalinizing granuloma is characterized by localized changes in lung architecture determined by deposition of hyaline collagenous fibrosis accompanied by sparse lymphocytic infiltrate that compresses and distorts the remaining bronchioles. A higher magnification, the mass is composed by hypocellular collagen lamellae.

Associations 
Morvan Syndrome
 HIV/AIDS
 Posterior uveitis
 Castleman's disease

References

Pulmonary lesion